"Opposites Attract" is a song by American singer Paula Abdul from her debut album, Forever Your Girl (1988). It was written and produced by Oliver Leiber. Vocals on the song, in addition to Abdul, were provided by Bruce DeShazer and Marv Gunn, also known as The Wild Pair. "Opposites Attract" was the sixth and final single from the album in November 1989 and achieved success in many countries, including the United States, Canada, and Australia, where it was a number-one hit. Lyrically, the song is about a couple who love each other despite being different in almost every way possible.

Chart performance
"Opposites Attract" initially rose from number 72 to number 47 the week of December 23, 1989, and landed at number one the week of February 10, 1990, where it remained for three weeks, matching the run of "Straight Up". It became Abdul's fourth number-one single on the Billboard Hot 100 and made her only the fourth artist in music history to score four number-one hits from a single album, after Whitney Houston, George Michael and Michael Jackson. (Janet Jackson, Mariah Carey, Usher and Katy Perry would later duplicate the feat.) "Opposites Attract" also topped the charts in Australia and Canada and peaked at number two in the United Kingdom.

Critical reception
Melody Maker commented, "Lovely, lovely Paula released her fourth American Number One. This kicks off with a smart little rap then Paula jumps in and tip-taps her way through sounding happy, naive and full of herself, like the homecoming queen out on her first real date. She can do no wrong. It must be love." Pan-European magazine Music & Media wrote, "For this release Abdul duets with The Wild Pair. The song also features a rap by Derrick Delite and is, of course, very danceable." A reviewer from People Magazine described it as one of "the liveliest cuts" from the album.

Music video
The song's accompanying music video was directed by Candace Reckinger and Michael Patterson, in which Abdul dances with cartoon character MC Skat Kat, voiced by The Wild Pair, Bruce DeShazer and Marvin Gunn.  An additional rap, written by Romany Malco was provided by Derrick "Delite" Stevens for the Street mix version of the song, which was edited for the 7"/video.

The idea of MC Skat Kat came from the Gene Kelly film Anchors Aweigh, where Kelly dances with Jerry Mouse from the Tom and Jerry cartoon series. Paula even choreographed the animated character's moves to match her live-action dance moves in the video. MC Skat Kat was animated by members of the Disney animation team, working outside the studio between major projects, under the direction of Chris Bailey. MC Skat Kat's movements were the result of rotoscoping animation, with Michael "Boogaloo Shrimp" Chambers standing in for the character against a blue screen, then drawing the animated form over Chambers' dance moves. The Wild Pair Marvin Gunn and Bruce DeShazer did not appear in the video, although two other cats (also animated) did appear, possibly meant to represent them.

The video won the 1991 Grammy Award for Best Short Form Music Video and was nominated for Breakthrough Video at the 1990 MTV Video Music Awards.

Track listings and formats

 7-inch and cassette single
 "Opposites Attract" (7-inch) – 3:45
 "One or the Other" (LP version) – 4:08

 US and Australian 12-inch single
 "Opposites Attract" (Street mix) – 4:28
 "Opposites Attract" (12-inch mix) – 5:40
 "Opposites Attract" (dub version) – 6:25
 "Opposites Attract" (Magnetic mix) – 4:01
 "Opposites Attract" (club mix) – 6:01
 "Opposites Attract" (Party dub) – 3:09

 Japanese CD single
 "Opposites Attract"  – 3:46
 "(It's Just) The Way That You Love Me"  – 4:03

 UK and Australian CD single
 "Opposites Attract" (Street mix) – 4:28
 "One or the Other" (LP version) – 4:08
 "Opposites Attract" (club mix) – 6:01
 "Opposites Attract" (Party dub) – 3:09

 UK 12-inch single
 "Opposites Attract" (Street mix) – 4:28
 "Opposites Attract" (Party dub) – 3:10
 "The Paula Abdul Megamix" ("Straight Up"/"Cold Hearted"/"The Way That You Love Me"/"Forever Your Girl"/"Knocked Out")

Credits and personnel
Credits and personnel are adapted from Forever Your Girl album liner notes.
 Paula Abdul – lead vocals
 The Wild Pair (Bruce DeShazer and Marv Gunn) – lead vocals
 Oliver Leiber – writer, producer, drum programming, keyboard, guitar
 Keith "K.C." Cohen – mixing at Skip Saylor Studio (Los Angeles)
 Pete Martinsen – engineering
 Russell Bracher – engineering
 Jeff Lorber – engineering, additional drum programming
 Cliff Jones – engineering
 Yvette Marine – background vocals
 Patti Brooks – background vocals

Charts

Weekly charts

Year-end charts

Decade-end charts

Certifications and sales

Release history

References

External links

1988 songs
1989 singles
Animated music videos
Billboard Hot 100 number-one singles
Cashbox number-one singles
Grammy Award for Best Short Form Music Video
Male–female vocal duets
New jack swing songs
Number-one singles in Australia
Paula Abdul songs
RPM Top Singles number-one singles
Songs written by Oliver Leiber
Virgin Records singles